Žibrše is a dispersed settlement in the hills northwest of Logatec in the Inner Carniola region of Slovenia.

References

External links
Žibrše on Geopedia
Žibrše Local Community site

Populated places in the Municipality of Logatec